Like a Virgin may refer to:

Music 
 Like a Virgin, a 1984 album by Madonna
 Like a Virgin, a 2004 EP by These Arms Are Snakes and Harkonen

 "Like a Virgin", a 1984 song by Madonna
 "Like a Virgin", a 1991 song by MC Lyte from the album Act Like You Know

Film and Television 
 Like a Virgin (film), 2006
 "Like a Virgin" (Veronica Mars), 2004
 "Like a Virgin", a 1990 episode from the television series Roseanne
 "Like a Virgin", a 1994 episode from the television series Family Matters
 "Like a Virgin", a 1997 episode from the television series Ellen
 "Like a Virgin", a 1999 episode from the television series Dawson's Creek
 "Like a Virgin", a 2001 episode from the television series Grounded for Life
 "Like a Virgin", a 2005 episode from the television series The War at Home
 "Like a Virgin", a 2006 episode from the television series Las Vegas
 "Like a Virgin", a 2007 episode from the television series Dante's Cove
 "Like a Virgin", a 2007 episode from the television series Instant Star
 "Like a Virgin", a 2011 episode from the television series Supernatural
 "Like a Virgin", a 2011 episode from the television series Winners & Losers

Literature 
 Like a Virgin (book), a 2012 book by Aarathi Prasad exploring virgin birth
  Like a Virgin: Secrets They Won't Teach You at Business School, a book by Richard Branson

See also
 "Like a Virgin Sacrificed", a song from Glory, Glamour and Gold by Army of Lovers
 "Plange quasi virgo" (Lament Like a Virgin), Tenebrae responsory